Judith Murray may refer to:

 Judith Sargent Murray (1751–1820), American advocate for women's rights and writer
 Judith Murray (artist) (born 1941), American abstract painter